, provisional designation , is a trans-Neptunian object and centaur from the outer Solar System, approximately  in diameter. It was discovered on 10 December 2002, by astronomers at the Palomar Observatory in California.

Orbit and physical characteristics 

 orbits the Sun at a distance of 27.9–46.8 AU once every 228 years and 4 months (83,410 days; semi-major axis of 37.36 AU). Its orbit has an eccentricity of 0.25 and an inclination of 14° with respect to the ecliptic. The body's observation arc begins with a precovery published by the Digitized Sky Survey and taken Palomar in December 1989, or 13 years prior to its official discovery observation.

As of 2016, after a total of 29 observations, its orbital uncertainty parameter is at 3. Its last observation was made by the Hubble Space Telescope in September 2008. On 10 August 1926, it most recently reached perihelion, when it was nearest to the Sun. It is a near 5:7 resonant trans-Neptunian object.

Numbering and naming 

This minor planet was numbered by the Minor Planet Center on 15 April 2004. As of 2018, it has not been named.

References

External links 
 Asteroid Lightcurve Database (LCDB), query form (info )
 Discovery Circumstances: Numbered Minor Planets (75001)-(80000) – Minor Planet Center
 
 

Trans-Neptunian objects
Discoveries by the Palomar Observatory
Possible dwarf planets
20021210